Chris Adrian (born November 7, 1970) is an American author.  Adrian's writing styles in short stories vary greatly; from modernist realism to pronounced lyrical allegory. His novels both tend toward surrealism, having mostly realistic characters experience fantastic circumstances.  He has written three novels: Gob's Grief, The Children's Hospital, and The Great Night. In 2008, he published A Better Angel, a collection of short stories. His short fiction has also appeared in The Paris Review, Zoetrope, Ploughshares, McSweeney's, The New Yorker, The Best American Short Stories, and Story. He was one of 11 fiction writers to receive a Guggenheim Fellowship in 2009. He lives in San Francisco.

Education
Adrian completed his bachelor's degree in English from the University of Florida in 1993. He received his M.D. from Eastern Virginia Medical School in 2001.  He completed a pediatric residency at the University of California, San Francisco, was a student at Harvard Divinity School, and a fellow of pediatric hematology/oncology at UCSF in 2011. He is also a graduate of the Iowa Writers' Workshop. Currently, Adrian serves as the Assistant Professor of Pediatrics at Columbia University Medical Center.

Bibliography

Novels
Gob's Grief (2001)
The Children's Hospital (2006)
The Great Night (2011)
The New World, with Eli Horowitz (2015)

Short story collections

 A Better Angel (collection, 2008, FSG) includes:
High Speeds (1997) (originally published in Story)The Sum of Our Parts (1999) (originally published in Ploughshares)Stab (2006) (originally published in Zoetrope: All-Story)The Vision of Peter Damien (2007) (originally published in Zoetrope: All-Story)A Better Angel (2006) (originally published in The New Yorker)The Changeling (2007) (originally published in Esquire as "Promise Breaker")A Hero of Chickamauga (1999) (originally published in Story)A Child's Book of Sickness and Death (2004) (originally published in McSweeney's 14)Why Antichrist? (2007) (originally published in Tin House)
 UncollectedYou Can Have It (1996) (published in The Paris Review 141)Grief (1997) (published in Story)Every Night for a Thousand Years (1997) (published in The New Yorker)Horse and Horseman (1998) (published in Zoetrope: All-Story) Available onlineThe Glass House (2000) (published in The New Yorker)The Stepfather (2005) (published in McSweeney's 18)A Tiny Feast (2009) (published in The New Yorker)The Black Square (2009) (published in McSweeney's 32)The Warm Fuzzies (2010) (published in The New Yorker)Grand Rounds'' (2012) (published in Granta 120)

References

External links

Info on Adrian

1970 births
Living people
University of Florida College of Liberal Arts and Sciences alumni
Harvard Divinity School alumni
Eastern Virginia Medical School alumni
American surrealist novelists
American short story writers
University of California, San Francisco alumni
Iowa Writers' Workshop alumni
American medical writers
American oncologists
American gay writers
American LGBT novelists
American male novelists
American male short story writers
American male non-fiction writers
21st-century American novelists
21st-century American male writers
21st-century American LGBT people